

B05A Blood and related products

B05AA Blood substitutes and plasma protein fractions
B05AA01 Serum albumin
B05AA02 Other plasma protein fractions
B05AA03 Fluorocarbon blood substitutes
B05AA05 Dextran
B05AA06 Gelatin agents
B05AA07 Hydroxyethylstarch
B05AA08 Hemoglobin crosfumaril
B05AA09 Hemoglobin raffimer
B05AA10 Hemoglobin glutamer (bovine)
QB05AA91 Hemoglobin betafumaril (bovine)

B05AX Other blood products
B05AX01 Erythrocytes
B05AX02 Thrombocytes
B05AX03 Blood plasma
B05AX04 Stem cells from umbilical cord blood

B05B I.v. solutions

B05BA Solutions for parenteral nutrition
B05BA01 Amino acids
B05BA02 Fat emulsions
B05BA03 Carbohydrates
B05BA04 Protein hydrolysates
B05BA10 Combinations

B05BB Solutions affecting the electrolyte balance
B05BB01 Electrolytes
B05BB02 Electrolytes with carbohydrates
B05BB03 Trometamol
B05BB04 Electrolytes in combination with other drugs

B05BC Solutions producing osmotic diuresis
B05BC01 Mannitol
B05BC02 Carbamide

B05C Irrigating solutions

B05CA Antiinfectives
B05CA01 Cetylpyridinium
B05CA02 Chlorhexidine
B05CA03 Nitrofural
B05CA04 Sulfamethizole
B05CA05 Taurolidine
B05CA06 Mandelic acid
B05CA07 Noxytiolin
B05CA08 Ethacridine lactate
B05CA09 Neomycin
B05CA10 Combinations

B05CB Salt solutions
B05CB01 Sodium chloride
B05CB02 Sodium citrate
B05CB03 Magnesium citrate
B05CB04 Sodium bicarbonate
B05CB10 Combinations

B05CX Other irrigating solutions
B05CX01 Glucose
B05CX02 Sorbitol
B05CX03 Glycine
B05CX04 Mannitol
B05CX10 Combinations

B05D Peritoneal dialytics

B05DA Isotonic solutions

B05DB Hypertonic solutions

B05X I.v. solution additives

B05XA Electrolyte solutions
B05XA01 Potassium chloride
B05XA02 Sodium bicarbonate
B05XA03 Sodium chloride
B05XA04 Ammonium chloride
B05XA05 Magnesium sulfate
B05XA06 Potassium phosphate, including combinations with other potassium salts
B05XA07 Calcium chloride
B05XA08 Sodium acetate
B05XA09 Sodium phosphate
B05XA10 Magnesium phosphate
B05XA11 Magnesium chloride
B05XA12 Zinc chloride
B05XA13 Hydrochloric acid
B05XA14 Sodium glycerophosphate
B05XA15 Potassium lactate
B05XA16 Cardioplegia solutions
B05XA17 Potassium acetate
B05XA18 Zinc sulfate
B05XA30 Combinations of electrolytes
B05XA31 Electrolytes in combination with other drugs

B05XB Amino acids
B05XB01 Arginine hydrochloride
B05XB02 Alanyl glutamine
B05XB03 Lysine

B05XC Vitamins

B05XX Other i.v. solution additives
B05XX02 Trometamol

B05Z Hemodialytics and hemofiltrates

B05ZA Hemodialytics, concentrates

B05ZB Hemofiltrates

References

B05